Lycée et collège Victor-Duruy is a public high school and sixth-form college/junior and senior high school in the 7th arrondissement of Paris.  most of its approximately 2,000 students live in the 7th and 15th arrondissements.

It opened on 8 October 1912 as a state sixth-form college for girls, in a former religious girls' educational institution that was later used as an artist's colony. It had primary classes until the post-World War II period. It was renovated in the 1950s, became coeducational in 1971, and received a second renovation from 1986 to 1996.

References

External links

 Lycée et collège Victor Duruy 

Educational institutions established in 1912
1912 establishments in France
Lycées in Paris
Buildings and structures in the 7th arrondissement of Paris